Lethal arthrogryposis with anterior horn cell disease (LAAHD)  is an autosomal recessive genetic disorder characterized by reduced mobility of the foetus and early death.

Presentation
LAAHD resembles LCCS1 disease but the phenotype is milder, with survival beyond 32nd gestational week.  However, the foetuses are often stillborn or survive only few minutes. The movements of the foetus during pregnancy are scanty and stiff, often only in upper limbs. The malpositions are distal.  The inwards spiral and especially the elbow contractures are less severe than in LCCS1 disease. Some patients have intrauterine long bone fractures. Skeletal muscles are affected and show neurogenic atrophy. The size and shape of spinal cord at different levels are normal but anterior horn motoneurons are diminished in number and degenerated.

Molecular genetics
LAAHD disease results from compound heterozygosity of GLE1FinMajor and a missense point mutation in exon 13 (6 cases in 3 families) or a missense mutation in exon 16 ( seven cases in 3 families). One of the latter cases survived 12 weeks, mostly under artificial respiration.

Diagnosis

Treatment

Epidemiology

LAAHD is one of approximately 40 Finnish heritage diseases.  Families affected by these diseases come from different parts of Finland, and birthplaces of the ancestors of affected individuals do not show geographic clustering.

References

External links 

Rare diseases
Genetic disorders with no OMIM